All Saints Cathedral is a religious building that is affiliated with the Anglican Church of South Africa and is located at Fiddes Street in the city of Mbabane  the capital and largest city in Eswatini. It was extended in 1993.

References

Anglican cathedrals in Eswatini
Buildings and structures in Mbabane